The Berkshire Record Society is a text publication society founded in 1993 to produce scholarly editions of important documents relating to the history of Berkshire, England, held at the Berkshire Record Office and elsewhere. It is a registered charity.

Selected publications
 Correspondence of the Foundling Hospital Inspectors in Berkshire, 1757–1768
 Berkshire Glebe Terriers, 1634
 Berkshire Overseers' Papers, 1654–1834
 Berkshire Probate Accounts, 1583–1712
 Enclosure in Berkshire, 1485–1885
 Reading Gild Accounts, 1357–1516 (Part I)
 Reading Gild Accounts, 1357–1516 (Part II)
 Newbury Kendrick Workhouse Records, 1627–1641
 Berkshire Nonconformist Meeting House Registrations, 1689–1852 (Part I)
 Berkshire Nonconformist Meeting House Registrations, 1689–1852 (Part II)
 Thames Navigation Commission Minutes, 1771–1790 (Part I)
 Thames Navigation Commission Minutes, 1771–1790 (Part II)
 The Diocese Books of Samuel Wilberforce
 Berkshire Religious Census 1851
 Berkshire Probate Index, 1480–1652 (Part I: Personal Names)
 Berkshire Probate Index, 1480–1652 (Part II: Place Names)
 Berkshire Probate Index, 1480–1652 (Part III: Occupations)
 Diaries and Correspondence of Robert Lee of Binfield 1736–1744
 Reading St Laurence Churchwardens' Accounts, 1498–1570 (Part I)
 Reading St Laurence Churchwardens' Accounts, 1498–1570 (Part II)
 The Church Inspection Notebook of Archdeacon James Randall 1855–1873 and other records
 Newbury and Chilton Pond Turnpike Records 1766–1791
 Berkshire Feet of Fines, 1307–1509 (Part I Fines 1307–1399)
 Berkshire Feet of Fines, 1307–1509 (Part II Fines 1400–1509 and Index)

References

External links
Official website

History of Berkshire
Organisations based in Berkshire
Text publication societies